Giorgio Tirabassi (born 1 February 1960) is an Italian film, television, and stage actor, as well as director.

Life and career
Born in Rome, Tirabassi made his debut as an actor in avant-garde theater and then worked at the Teatro Stabile di Catania. Since 1982, he has been a member of the stage company of Gigi Proietti.

His breakout role was the inspector Ardenzi in the Canale 5 crime TV-series Distretto di Polizia.

In 2001, he made his directorial debut with the short Non dire gatto, winning a David di Donatello for Best Short Film.  In 2011, he won a Ciak d'oro for best supporting actor for his performance in Ascanio Celestini's La pecora nera.

Tirabassi is also a singer and is the lead vocalist in the band Music Inn.

On 1 November 2019, Tirabassi suffered a heart attack while presenting his first movie as director. He was hospitalized in stable condition, and recovered in a short time.

Selected filmography
 Kaputt Mundi (1998)
 The Dinner (1998)
 Bell'amico (2002)
 Paz! (2002)
 Don't Make Any Plans for Tonight (2006)
 Boris (2007–2010)
 La pecora nera (2010)
 Unlikely Revolutionaries (2010)
 Boris: The Film (2011)
 Piazza Fontana: The Italian Conspiracy (2012)
 Arance e martello (2014)
 Il camionista (2016)
 Freaks Out (2020)

Awards and recognition
 2002: David di Donatello for Best Short Film for Non dire gatto.

References

External links
 
 

1951 births
Male actors from Rome
Italian male stage actors
Nastro d'Argento winners
David di Donatello winners
Italian male film actors
Italian male television actors
Living people